This is a list of defunct airlines of Slovenia.

See also
 List of airlines of Slovenia
 List of airports in Slovenia
 List of airlines of Yugoslavia

References

Slovenia
Airlines
Airlines, defunct